UWA Publishing, formerly known as the Text Books Board and then University of Western Australia Press, is a Western Australian publisher established in 1935 by the University of Western Australia. It produces a range of non-fiction and fiction titles.

Background and establishment
Australia's first scholarly publisher was Melbourne University Press, established in 1922. The University of Queensland proposed an Australia-wide university press at the 1932 Universities Conference, but the Melbourne press did not support this idea. University students' ongoing difficulties with obtaining textbooks were common at the time, and the Australian universities had different ways of addressing the issue. During the 1920s, the University of Western Australia (UWA) appointed several booksellers, who each reported that selling textbooks was not commercially viable due to low student numbers (in 1935, UWA had 787 students, compared to 3,497 at Melbourne and 1,090 at Queensland).

UWA's vice-chancellor, Hubert Whitfeld, believed that "Australian universities ought to publish very much more than they do", and established the Text Books Board in 1935 with support from academics Walter Murdoch and Fred Alexander. It was known as the Text Books Board until 1948, when it took on the name University of Western Australia Press.

Late 20th century
Scholarly publishing at the UWA Press continually struggled to be commercially viable. The market was small and the press was isolated from other cities and markets. Subsidised journals were published during the 1960s for UWA's departments, which were time-consuming for press staff and despite the subsidies, rarely met their costs. Production of the journals ended in 1973. During the 1970s, textbooks were replaced with "recommended readings", and students no longer needed to purchase textbooks.

During the 1980s, advances in printing processes reduced the cost of printing books, but the rising popularity of photocopiers saw lecturers create course readers to save students time and money. Course readers contain photocopies of journal articles, book chapters and monographs, specific to a particular course or topic. Several university presses in Australia closed during the 1980s, and the UWA Press's grant and staff levels were reduced.

21st century
The press combined with the Western Australian History Foundation in 2000 to offer the WA History Foundation Award, which encourages and publishes works on Western Australian history. The first work published was Blood Sweat and Welfare: A History of White Bosses and Aboriginal Pastoral Workers by Mary Anne Jebb. In 2000, it started publishing a quarterly newsletter, which includes new books.

In 2001, the press selected the Eurospan Group to promote and distribute their books in the United Kingdom, Europe and the Middle East. In 2004, it ran a series of articles on the members of the board.

The organisation celebrated its 70th anniversary in 2005, and gave an opportunity to post-graduate students to have their manuscripts published. Fiction series editor Terri-ann White explained, "We're looking for literary fiction, so that's the distinction. We're not looking for mass market." The press approached Australian university coordinators in creative writing courses for recommendations of the work of post-graduate students in PhDs and master's degrees.

The publishing house changed its name to UWA Publishing in 2009.

Dorothy Hewett Award
In 2015 it established the Dorothy Hewett Award (in honour of the writer Dorothy Hewett) for an unpublished completed manuscript of fiction, narrative non-fiction or poetry.

In the inaugural edition of the award in 2016, Josephine Wilson won the award for her second novel, Extinctions., Kyra Giorgi's manuscript for her first novel, The Circle and the Equator was Highly Commended.

In February 2018 Julie Watts won the award for Legacy, an unpublished manuscript of collected poems.

Reduced output
In November 2019 the University of Western Australia announced its plans to close UWA Publishing.

In 2020, the university announced that UWA Publishing would continue to produce literary works, operating under a hybrid publishing model with internal management re-aligned to the University Library.

References

External links
 UWAP web site

See also
Melbourne University Publishing
Sesquicentenary Celebrations Series

Book publishing companies of Australia
University presses of Australia
Publishing
Publishing companies established in 1935
Western Australian literature
1935 establishments in Australia